Knesebeck most often refers to:
The German noble family von dem Knesebeck
Karl Friedrich von dem Knesebeck, Prussian Field Marshal, credited with planning the Battle of the Nations (1768–1848)

Places
Knesebeck, Germany

People with the name
Thomas von dem Knesebeck, Privy Councillor and Landeshauptmann (Governor) of the Altmark (1559–1625)
Hempo von dem Knesebeck, diplomat and Master of the Horse to Christian I. of Anhalt (1595–1656)
Levin von dem Knesebeck, Prussian author and poet (1597–1638)
Karl Ludwig von dem Knesebeck, Royal Prussian Chamberlain (1694-1760)
Karl Friedrich von dem Knesebeck, Prussian Field Marshal, credited with planning the Battle of the Nations (1768–1848)
Friedrich August Wilhelm von dem Knesebeck, Hanoverian Major-General (1775-1842)
August von dem Knesebeck, German Major-General (1804–1886)
Ernst Julius Georg von dem Knesebeck, Hanoverian Lieutenant-General (1809–1869)
Alfred von dem Knesebeck, Major in the Gardes du Corps, Member of the Reichstag (1816-1883)
Bernhard Friedrich August von dem Knesebeck, German Major-General (1817–1887)
Theodor Otto Erich Paridam von dem Knesebeck, German Major-General (1832–1910)
Alexander August Julius von dem Knesebeck, German Lieutenant-General (1836–1920)
Lothar Eugen Wilhelm von dem Knesebeck, German Lieutenant-General (1837–1928)
Wilhelm Erich Cuno von dem Knesebeck, German Lieutenant-General (1841–1915)
Lionel von dem Knesebeck, Hofmarschall to Prince Frederick Charles of Hesse, last King of Finland (1849-1916)
Bodo von dem Knesebeck, Imperial Chamberlain and Master of Ceremonies, Secretary of the Order of the Black Eagle, created the German Diplomatic Corps (1851-1911)
Gerlach Hermann August von dem Knesebeck, German Major-General (1854–1917)
Bernd von dem Knesebeck, German naval Commander, commanded the V Torpedo Boat Flotilla at the Battle of Dogger Bank; killed when his flagship SMS G 12 was sunk on 8 September 1915 (1876-1915).
Georg von dem Knesebeck, German Lieutenant-General (1881–1955)
Wasmod von dem Knesebeck, World War II German Colonel, recipient of the Knight's Cross of the Iron Cross (1910–1945)
Klaus von dem Knesebeck, World War II German Colonel, recipient of the German Cross in Gold
Krafft von dem Knesebeck, World War II German Captain, recipient of the German Cross in Gold (1916–1942)
Natalia von dem Knesebeck, Santiago, Chile
Roberto von dem Knesebeck, Santiago, Chile

Walter Calmels von dem Knesebeck, 

Knesebeck